CKHK-FM (107.7 MHz) is a Canadian radio station licensed to Hawkesbury, Ontario. Owned by Evanov Communications, it broadcasts a country format branded as Hot Country 107.7.

History
On June 27, 2007, Ottawa Media Inc. was licensed by the CRTC to operate a new FM station at Hawkesbury.

On April 14, 2008 at 9:00 AM, the station was launched as 107.7 The Jewel, with a soft adult contemporary format.

In May 2021, the station flipped to country as Hot Country 107.7, as part of a realignment of several Evanov stations.

References

External links
 Hot Country 107.7
 
 

Khk
Khk
Khk
Radio stations established in 2007
Hawkesbury, Ontario
2007 establishments in Ontario